Simona Karochová (born 1988) is a Czech orienteering and ski-orienteering competitor. She won a bronze medal in the relay event at the 2009 World Ski Orienteering Championships, with Barbora Chudíková and Helena Randáková.

See also
 List of orienteers
 List of orienteering events

References

External links
 

Czech orienteers
Female orienteers
Ski-orienteers
1988 births
Living people